The 4th Infantry Regiment was a French infantry regiment.

The Napoleonic Wars

War Of The Third Coalition
The regiment took part in the Battle of Dürenstein where it lost its regimental eagle.

Regiments of the First French Empire
Infantry regiments of France

fr:4e régiment d'infanterie

The 4th Foreign Regiment (French: 4e Régiment étranger, 4e RE) is a training regiment of the Foreign Legion in the French Army. Prior to assuming the main responsibility of training Legion recruits, it was an infantry unit which participated in campaigns in Morocco, Levant, French Indochina, and Algeria.